Henry Clay Putnam (January 17, 1846July 7, 1913) was an American businessman, Republican politician, and Wisconsin pioneer.  He served four years each in the Wisconsin State Senate and Assembly, representing Green County.  During the American Civil War, he was enlisted in the Union Army.

Early life
Putnam was born in Newark, Ohio, in 1846. He moved to Wisconsin with his parents in 1849, settling in Decatur in Green County.  He was educated in the common schools in Green County until age 16, when he enlisted in the Union Army.

Civil War service
Putnam enlisted in the Summer of 1863 and was enrolled as a private in Company B of the 1st Wisconsin Cavalry Regiment.  He was subsequently promoted to corporal.  He joined the regiment near Chattanooga, Tennessee, in the midst of the Chattanooga campaign.  With the regiment, he went on to participate in the Battle of Mossy Creek, the Battle of Dandridge, Sherman's Atlanta Campaign, and Wilson's Raid in Alabama and Georgia.

Postbellum career
Putnam mustered out with his regiment in July 1865.  After returning to Wisconsin, he worked as a traveling salesman for nine years, then worked in the lumber business and operated a farm.  In the 1890s he became involved with the Green County Bank of Brodhead as vice president.

Politically, Putnam associated with the Republican Party.  He was elected president of the Village of Brodhead, Wisconsin, in 1883 and 1884 and was elected to the Wisconsin State Assembly in 1890 and 1892.  In 1894, he was elected to the Wisconsin State Senate, representing the 17th Senate district for four years.  He was not a candidate for re-election in 1898.

He died at his home in Brodhead, Wisconsin, in 1913.

Personal life and family
Putnam was active for the remainder of his life in the Wisconsin chapter of the Grand Army of the Republic.  He married Frances Sutherland, but their only child died in infancy.

Electoral history

Wisconsin Assembly (1890, 1892)

| colspan="6" style="text-align:center;background-color: #e9e9e9;"| General Election, November 4, 1890

| colspan="6" style="text-align:center;background-color: #e9e9e9;"| General Election, November 8, 1892

Wisconsin Senate (1894)

| colspan="6" style="text-align:center;background-color: #e9e9e9;"| General Election, November 6, 1894

References

External links

|-

1846 births
1913 deaths
Politicians from Newark, Ohio
People from Brodhead, Wisconsin
Republican Party Wisconsin state senators
Republican Party members of the Wisconsin State Assembly
American bankers
People of Wisconsin in the American Civil War
Union Army soldiers